Mukim Mentiri is a mukim in Brunei-Muara District, Brunei. The population was 30,192 in 2016.

Name 
The mukim is named after Kampong Mentiri, one of the villages it encompasses.

Geography 
The mukim is located in the north-east of the district, bordering the South China Sea to the north, Mukim Serasa to the east, the Brunei Bay to the south, Mukim Kota Batu to the south-west and Mukim Berakas 'A' and Mukim Berakas 'B' to the west.

Demographics 
As of 2016 census, the population was 30,192 with  males and  females. The mukim had 5,292 households occupying 5,280 dwellings. The entire population lived in urban areas.

Villages 
As of 2016, the mukim comprised the following census villages:

Infrastructures 
The mukim is home to the following public housing estates:
 RPN Mentiri
 RPN Panchor Mengkubau
 RPN Tanah Jambu in Kampong Tanah Jambu
 STKRJ Sungai Buloh in Kampong Sungai Buloh
 STKRJ Tanah Jambu in Kampong Tanah Jambu

Pehin Datu Seri Maharaja Secondary School is the sole secondary school in the mukim.

Salar Industrial Park in Kampong Salar is one of the industrial parks in the country.

Notes

References 

Mentiri
Brunei-Muara District